Sudden Brook is a watercourse in Greater Manchester and a tributary of the River Roch. It originates in to the north of Royton, Oldham and flows Northwards through Kirkholt and Sandbrook Park to join the River Roch at Sudden.

Tributaries
Sand Brook ?
Turf Hill Brook ?
Buersil Brook ?
Also flows from well'ith lane to the old Ashfield valley across the bottom (south) of
"The P streets" -Phillip St to Pullman St where it is known as Jackie Brook.

References
http://www.rochdaleobserver.co.uk/news/s/515/515349_well_it_seemed_a_good_idea_at_the_time.html

Rivers of the Metropolitan Borough of Rochdale
1